The Synchronous Meteorological Satellite (SMS) program, was a program where NASA developed two weather satellites; which were placed into geosynchronous orbit.

History
SMS-1 was launched May 17, 1974 and SMS-2 was launched February 6, 1975. Both satellites were carried to orbit by Delta 2914 rockets. The program was initiated after the successes achieved by the Applications Technology Satellite (ATS) research satellites, which demonstrated the feasibility of using satellites in geosynchronous orbit for meteorology. The Geostationary Operational Environmental Satellite (GOES) program, which now supports weather forecasting, severe storm tracking, and meteorology research in the United States, followed immediately after the SMS program; the GOES 1 satellite was initially designated SMS-C. SMS-1 and SMS-2; and GOES-1, GOES-2, and GOES-3; were essentially identical.

List of SMS satellites

References 

 
Satellites in geosynchronous orbit
Weather satellites of the United States